Chris Lea is a designer, politician and political activist in Canada. He was the leader of the Green Party of Canada from 1990 to 1996. Lea is notable for being the first openly gay political party leader in Canadian history.

Biography
Lea is a graduate student in theory and policy studies at the Ontario Institute for Studies in Education. He was formerly a professional architect.

During the 1980s, he volunteered for The Body Politic, a periodical focusing on gay issues, sitting briefly on its editorial collective, and serving on the committee that set up Xtra!, Canada's most successful gay newspaper. Lea worked on the committee that organized the Summit Citizen's Conference, the counter-summit to the G-7 meetings taking place in Toronto in 1988. With Frank de Jong, Lea organized a successful viral campaign against McDonald's use of disposable styrofoam clamshell packing containers and as well a series of protests which stalled the expansion of nuclear power in Ontario in the early 1990s by bringing light on the massive debt that the province's nuclear programme had created.

Lea, who hails from a family of entertainers that includes the 1950s Canadian TV icon Shirley Harmer, began a side career as an opera performer in 2002, and in February 2005 undertook his first on-stage solo in a performance of Gioacchino Rossini's The Barber of Seville.

He was the director of facilities at Hart House at the University of Toronto, where as part of a team he won a Green Innovation Award in 2010, for a project to utilise electrical power generated from exercise bikes. For many years he was vice-President of the Toronto Opera Repertoire, and is now President of Toronto City Opera.

Lea lives in Toronto.

Green Party leadership
Lea was the leader of the Green Party of Canada from 1990 to 1996. The Green Party of Canada's internal organization was very decentralized in the early 1990s, and its leadership position was seen as a nominal title. In his time as leader though, Lea worked to create a more usual party structure. Lea started Green Canada, the party's internal members' newspaper (which later became Green Canada Vert before it was absorbed into the Green Party of Canada web pages). Lea initiated the practice of having regular teleconference meetings of the party's council. Aided by de Jong and Steve Kisby, Lea was the first to compile a comprehensive Green Party policy document for electronic distribution. Lea was the first Green Party of Canada leader to do a national tour (from Halifax to Clayoquot Sound, by bike, rail and air, during the 1993 federal election) and was the first to represent the party in a nationally televised debate. Lea created TV commercials and print advertising for elections and the 1992 Meech Lake Accord referendum. He advocated for a unified corporate identity for the party, and designed the first Green Party logo to be used nationally.

As leader, Lea made presentations to royal commissions on electoral reform and on financing the CBC, sometimes in French. As well Lea helped to organize party conferences and took part in legal challenges against the broadcast consortium that regulates the televised debates during the election period.

In 1994, to settle an impasse between the U.S. Committees of Correspondence (the national green party) and the California Green Party over representation to the 1995 World Green Coordination meeting in Mexico City, Lea organized an international election covering Canada, the U.S and the Caribbean, electing Ontario's Ella Haley and New Jersey's Anila Walkin.

As party leader, Lea campaigned for the House of Commons of Canada in the 1993 federal election, and received 623 votes in the Toronto riding of Trinity—Spadina for a sixth-place finish. He also campaigned for the Ontario legislature in the 1995 provincial election as a candidate of the Green Party of Ontario, and received 241 votes in the Toronto riding of St. George—St. David. He has not sought federal or provincial office since this time, though he remains active within the Green Party. In 1998, he volunteered to be the party's chief agent to relieve Steve Kisby from these duties.

Lea has long been an ally of Jim Harris in the Toronto Green community, and supported Harris's bid for re-election as party leader in 2004.

References

21st-century Canadian LGBT people
Year of birth missing (living people)
Living people
Green Party of Canada leaders
Gay politicians
Canadian LGBT politicians
Green Party of Canada candidates in the 1993 Canadian federal election
University of Toronto people
LGBT architects
Canadian gay men